Frailea schilinzkyana is a species of Frailea from Brazil to Argentina.

References

External links
 
 

schilinzkyana
Cacti of South America
Flora of Argentina
Flora of Brazil